Gilbert Peterson (born February 28, 1936) is an American actor and singer best known for such films and television series as The Cool Ones, The President's Plane Is Missing, The F.B.I. and Valley of the Dolls.

He attended Mississippi State University and played halfback for the Mississippi State football team.

Peterson's first TV appearance was in the drama Combat! as a German SS soldier in the fourth season episode "The Raider".
He appeared as Jim Otis in the 1967 episode "Solid Foundation" of the television series Death Valley Days.

Partial filmography
 The Brain Machine (1977) as Dr. Elton Morris
 Valley of the Dolls (1967) as Neeley's Leading Man (uncredited)
 The Cool Ones (1967) as Cliff Donner

References

External links

1936 births
Living people
American male film actors
American male television actors
Male actors from Mississippi
People from Winona, Mississippi